James Melvin Becannon  (August 22, 1859 – November 5, 1923), was a Major League Baseball pitcher for the New York Metropolitans of the American Association. He later played in one game as a third baseman for the New York Giants of the National League. He also played for several years in the minor leagues, where he was a teammate of Connie Mack in Hartford.

He died in New York on November 5, 1923.

References

External links
 
 

1859 births
1923 deaths
Major League Baseball pitchers
New York Metropolitans players
New York Giants (NL) players
Hartford Dark Blues (minor league) players
Binghamton Crickets (1880s) players
Buffalo Bisons (minor league) players
Wilkes-Barre Coal Barons players
Baseball players from New York (state)
19th-century baseball players